Jaromir Becka (born 6 July 1963) is a Czechoslovak born former professional tennis player from Germany.

Biography
Originally from Prague in what was then Czechoslovakia, Becka emigrated to West Germany and was based in Pullach, Munich. He was the Munich Junior Champion in 1980, then in 1981 was the National Indoor Junior Champion and a member of the Valeria Cup team.

Becka made the quarter-finals of two Grand Prix tournaments in 1983, the Tel Aviv Open and Grand Prix de Tennis de Toulouse. Also that year he came close to beating Vitas Gerulaitis at the Munich WCT tournament. After winning the first set comfortably, he lost the next two in tiebreaks. 

In 1984 he reached the quarter-finals of the Bavarian International Tennis Championships and had a win over Roscoe Tanner in Cleveland.

He won two titles on the Challenger circuit, both in doubles, at Thessaloniki in 1986 and Heilbronn in 1988.

Formerly a coach of Carsten Arriens, Becka now runs a tennis school in Munich.

Challenger titles

Doubles: (2)

References

External links
 
 

1963 births
Living people
West German male tennis players
Czechoslovak emigrants to Germany
Tennis players from Prague
Tennis players from Munich